Communauté d'agglomération de Forbach Porte de France is the communauté d'agglomération, an intercommunal structure, centred on the town of Forbach. It is located in the Moselle department, in the Grand Est region, northeastern France. Created in 2003, its seat is in Forbach. Its area is 139.1 km2. Its population was 76,764 in 2019, of which 21,597 in Forbach proper.

Composition
The communauté d'agglomération consists of the following 21 communes:

Alsting
Behren-lès-Forbach
Bousbach
Cocheren
Diebling
Etzling
Farschviller
Folkling
Forbach
Kerbach
Metzing
Morsbach
Nousseviller-Saint-Nabor
Œting
Petite-Rosselle
Rosbruck
Schœneck
Spicheren
Stiring-Wendel
Tenteling
Théding

References

Forbach Porte de France
Forbach Porte de France